Giovanni Battista Castiglione (1516–1598) was the Italian tutor of Princess (later Queen) Elizabeth I. It is speculated that he taught Prince (later King) Edward VI.  A humanist reformer, he was imprisoned in the Tower of London in 1556 by Elizabeth's sister, Mary I.  Suspected of sedition, he was tortured so severely that he was left permanently lame.  Later, he carried Elizabeth's letters when she herself was imprisoned in the Tower.

Castiglione was born in Gassino, near Torino, in Piedmont, son of Captain Piero Castiglione, of Mantua; he served in the Army of Charles V, Holy Roman Emperor, at Landrecies and Boulogne. He was appointed to young Elizabeth's Court as Master of the Italian Tongue in November 1544, and when Elizabeth became Queen he was made Groom of her Privy Chamber, which post he held until shortly before his death. He was granted by her the Manor of Benham Valence, in Berkshire and he was buried in the nearby church of St Mary, Speen. He married, in London in 1558, Margaret Allen, widow of Lazarus Allen and the illegitimate daughter of expatriate Florentine Merchant Bartolomeo Compagni (1503–1561), and they had a large family.  One son, Sir Francis Castilion (1561-1638) became a pensioner of James I and a Member of Parliament for Great Bedwyn.  Another son, Captain Peter Castillion, was a professional soldier who settled in Ireland and married Thomasine Peyton, daughter of Sir Christopher Peyton, Auditor-General of Ireland.

References

Tudor England
People from Gassino Torinese